Chlidichthys pembae is a species of fish in the family Pseudochromidae.

Description

Distribution and habitat
Chlidichthys pembae is found in the Indian Ocean from Tanzania to South Africa including Ibo Mozambique, the Comoro Islands, and Sodwana Bay, in the Natal of South Africa.

References

Heemstra, P.C., 1995. Additions and corrections for the 1995 impression. p. v-xv. In M.M. Smith and P.C. Heemstra (eds.) Revised Edition of Smiths' Sea Fishes. Springer-Verlag, Berlin.

Pseudoplesiopinae
Taxa named by J. L. B. Smith
Fish described in 1954